De Lamar (also DeLamar) is a ghost town in Owyhee County, Idaho, United States. The community lies within an area governed by the Bureau of Land Management.

The community formed around the De Lamar Mine, which was established in 1888.  Named for mining magnate and former sea captain Joseph Raphael De Lamar, the mine and community quickly boomed and busted, declining after 1890.  Despite the community's decline, it continued to exist as a populated community for several decades; it was the location of a summer-only post office from 1917 to 1930.

In 1976, the ghost town was listed on the National Register of Historic Places as a historic district.

References

External links
Ghosttowns.com profile for De Lamar

Populated places established in 1888
Ghost towns in Idaho
Historic districts on the National Register of Historic Places in Idaho
Mining communities in Idaho
Geography of Owyhee County, Idaho
1888 establishments in Idaho Territory
National Register of Historic Places in Owyhee County, Idaho
Populated places on the National Register of Historic Places in Idaho